Clube de Futebol Andorinha de Santo António (abbreviated as CF Andorinha) is a Portuguese football club based in Santo António, Funchal, on the island of Madeira.

Background
CF Andorinha currently plays in the Terceira Divisão Série Madeira which is the fifth tier of Portuguese Football. The club was founded on 6 May 1925, and they play their home matches at the Estádio Do Andorinha in Santo António, Funchal. The stadium is able to accommodate 500 spectators. It is a small stadium with a synthetic playing surface and seating for 400 people. The ground is located in the northern area of Funchal's Santo António freguesia, on the outskirts of the city. It is in very close proximity to C.S. Marítimo's training complex and Andorinha's ground is in fact often used to stage matches for Marítimo's youth teams.

Up until the end of the 2008–09 season CF Andorinha only played Distritais (Tier 5) football on Madeira but following league restructuring the 1ª Divisão clubs of the AF Madeira became part of the Terceira Divisão (Third Division) in 2009–10. After finishing second at the end of the First Phase, Andorinha won the Promotion Group and gained promotion to Segunda Divisão Série Norte for 2010–11 with the manager/coach Nelson Calaça e Duarte Santos. While their first season in the Second Division proved short with relegation at the end of the season, it was a tremendous achievement for the club to be competing against mainland clubs for the first time at the Portuguese third tier level.

The club is considered youth training and has had many young promising players play for them, including Cristiano Ronaldo. They have a partnership with FC Porto Dragon Force schools from 2012–2014 with the manager Nelson Rosado's leadership. The club is also affiliated to Associação de Futebol da Madeira and has competed in the AF Madeira Taça. The club has also entered the national cup competition known as Taça de Portugal on a few occasions.

Season to season

Honours
 Terceira Divisão – Serie Madeira: 1
2009–10
 AF Madeira Championship: 1
2007–08
 AF Madeira Cup: 1
1985–86

References

External links
Zerozero team profile

Football clubs in Portugal
Association football clubs established in 1925
Sport in Madeira
1925 establishments in Portugal